The Roman Catholic Archdiocese of Antofagasta is a Latin rite Metropolitan archdiocese in northern Chile's Antofagasta Province.

Special churches 
 Its cathedral archiepiscopal see is Catedral San José, dedicated to Saint Joseph, in the city of Antofagasta. 
 It also has a Minor Basilica : Basílica del Corazón de María

History 
 1881: Established as Mission “sui iuris” of Antofagasta, on territory split off from the Diocese of La Serena (now Metropolitan)
 1887: Promoted as Apostolic Vicariate of Antofagasta
 3 February 1928: Promoted as Diocese of Antofagasta
 1965.07.21: Lost territory to establish Territorial Prelature of Calama (now suffragan Diocese of San Juan de Calama)
 28 June 1967: Promoted as Metropolitan Archdiocese of Antofagasta/ Antofagasten(sis) (Latin adjective)
 Enjoyed a Papal visit from Pope John Paul II in April 1987.

Statistics 
As per 2014, it pastorally served 386,017 Catholics (70.2% of 550,256 total) on 84,504 km² in 20 parishes and 67 missions with 37 priests (18 diocesan, 19 religious), 28 deacons, 108 lay religious (24 brothers, 84 sisters) and 2 seminarians.

Ecclesiastical province 
The Metropolitan's Suffragan sees are :
 Roman Catholic Diocese of Iquique
 Roman Catholic Diocese of San Juan Bautista de Calama, its daughter see
 Roman Catholic Diocese of San Marcos de Arica

Bishops
(all Roman rite Chileans)

Ordinaries
 Ecclesiastical Superior of Antofagasta 
 Father Florencio Eduardo Fontecilla Sánchez (1883 – 1886.12.23), next Bishop of mother see La Serena (Chile) (1890.06.26 – death 1909.03.03)

Apostolic Vicars of Antofagasta 
 Bishop-elect Luís Silva Lezaeta first term (1887.05.15 – 1896)
 Fr. Felipe Salas Errázuriz (1896.03.04 – 1905)
 Luís Silva Lezaeta again (1904.11.04 – 1928.02.03 see below), Titular Bishop of Olena (1912.01.05 – 1928.02.03)

Suffragan Bishops of Antofagasta 
 Luís Silva Lezaeta (see above 1928.02.03 – death 1929.05.21)
 Alfredo Cifuentes Gómez (1933.12.23 – 1943.06.05), next Metropolitan Archbishop of La Serena (Chile) (1943.06.05 – 1967.03.10), Apostolic Administrator ad nutum Sanctae Sedis of Apostolic Administration of Copiapó (Chile) (1947.03.19 – 1948.06.17), emeritate as Titular Archbishop of Thapsus (1967.03.10 – retired 1970.12.02), died 1989
BIOs TO ELABORATE
 Hernán Frías Hurtado (1945.01.13 – 1957.05.24)
 Francisco de Borja Valenzuela Ríos (1957.08.20 – 1967.06.28 see below)

Metropolitan Archbishops of Antofagasta 
 Francisco de Borja Valenzuela Ríos (see above 1967.06.28 – 1974.03.25), next Archbishop (personal title) of San Felipe (1974.03.25 - 1993.04.16)
 Carlos Oviedo Cavada, O. de M. (1974.03.25 – 1990.03.30), next Metropolitan Archbishop of Santiago de Chile (1990.03.30 - 1998.02.16), elevated to Cardinal in 1994; died 7 December 1998
 Patricio Infante Alfonso (1990.12.12 – 2004.11.26)
 Pablo Lizama Riquelme (2004.11.26 – 8 June 2017)
 Ignacio Francisco Ducasse Medina (8 June 2017 – ...)

Coadjutor bishop
Pablo Lizama Riquelme (2004)

Auxiliary bishops
Arturo Mery Beckdorf (1941-1944, Apostolic Administrator 1943-1944), appointed Bishop of Valdivia
Juan Luis Ysern de Arce (1972-1974), appointed	Bishop of San Carlos de Ancud
Juan Bautista Herrada Armijo, O. de M. (1991-1997)

See also 
 List of Catholic dioceses in Chile

Sources and external links 

 GCatholic.org
 Diocese website 
 
 Catholic Hierarchy

Roman Catholic dioceses in Chile
Religious organizations established in 1881
Antofagasta
Roman Catholic dioceses and prelatures established in the 19th century
Roman Catholic ecclesiastical provinces in Chile
1881 establishments in Chile